Coyote Calhoun (sometimes referred to as Coyote J) is a radio disc-jockey known for his 7-12 midnight show in the 1970s at WERC, a Birmingham, Alabama Top 40, and later at CHR Z-102 (WZBQ) and I-95 in the 1980s. For 35 years he has been a successful radio personality in Birmingham while making stops in Nashville (WKDA/KDF), San Diego (KPRI 91X), Denver (KBCO), New Orleans (WQUE-Q93), and Mobile (WABB-FM). Calhoun has been a night-time/morning drive personality at several Birmingham radio stations and later in his career became known for his syndicated dark wave show, "The Edge". Coyote J was part of the original air staff hired by WKDF, Nashville's progressive rock station, and WRAX (The X) Birmingham's Alternative Rock station.

Nashville: WKDA-FM/WKDF-FM

Switch from automation to live
WKDA-FM went live in the evening hours and on weekends with a progressive rock format in the early winter of 1974 and Coyote worked on air under the name Jim Battan, sometimes spelled Jim Baton, while still in high school; this came after a short stint on WKDA-AM where he worked under several different names. Mr. Battan did weekends but also did 7-12 midnight in the summer/autumn of 1974.

Pensacola
Battan went to WBSR AM in late 1974 to do 7-12 midnight and experiment with a more brash, TOP 40 style that he would later bring to Birmingham, New Orleans, and San Diego.

Birmingham

In 1975, Battan was hired by WERC Birmingham as a night-time Top 40 screamer. When WERC nighttime jock Chris Foxx (aka 'Superfoxx') abruptly quit over a contract dispute in late 1974, the company flipped Battan to WERC's AM from their FM and christened him Coyote J Calhoun (this time the name would stick). From 1975 to 1979 Coyote J was enormously popular in Birmingham and consistently won the 12 + audiences during his reign. In one of his most controversial acts, Coyote J faked his own murder on air, a stunt that led police and paramedics to storm the building expecting to find a knife wielding intruder inside. This led to a 5-day suspension, the first of many that would be handed down to the disc-jockey. Calhoun wrestled a live black bear before a packed house at Boutwell Auditorium in 1976. The fight abruptly ended after Coyote hit the bear over the head with a folding chair, annoying its handlers. When asked why he did it, Coyote replied, 'he started it.' In 1979, near the end of WERC's dominance and with the demise of AM Top 40 radio in sight, Coyote J resigned and left for Los Angeles to do stand-up comedy and immerse himself in the neophyte punk/new wave scene.

San Diego : In 1981 Coyote moved to KPRI-FM to do 7 to midnight and officially became a provocateur of new wave/post punk music on commercial radio. While in San Diego Calhoun worked as a bona fide shock jock under famed consultant Reid Reker.

Back to 'Bama
In 1982, after a short stay in Denver, Coyote J left the West Coast to head back south with a bevy of new wave in tow and began playing 'new music' throughout the southeast. Coyote took the specialty show gig at WAPI-FM Birmingham (95 Rock) and began spinning another generation's soundtrack.

In 1983 Coyote was transferred to WABB-FM Mobile, the sister station of I-95 (Dittman), where he did afternoons on the CHR and his new music show for PD Leslie Fram (99X Atlanta); in 1983 Coyote won the 'Bobby Poe Air Personality of the Year' award presented to him by Nashville colleague Scott Shannon.

New Orleans
In 1985 Coyote J landed the 7-midnight opening at WQUE-FM New Orleans. At 'Q-93' the dj debut an expanded version of his post punk program and began to use the name The Edge. In New Orleans Calhoun began incorporating dark wave, gothic, and Industrial to his new music play list. Q-93 flipped from CHR to urban in late 1986 and Coyote was cut loose.

Back to Birmingham and 20 years of The Edge
Coyote J found himself back in Birmingham in the spring of 1987, once again employed as a night-time screamer for a new personality-driven CHR, WZBQ, Z-102 (going up against the other Top 40 stations in town, I-95, as well as WKXX, KICKS 106). Calhoun reintroduced his Sunday night show as The Edge to Tuscaloosa, Birmingham, and surrounding areas. While at Z-102 in 1988, Coyote found himself in the middle of controversy once again due to him stunting Z-102 with a classic rock format, airing songs by Boston, Mountain (band) and Pink Floyd, culminating with Calhoun getting fired live on the air.  Before it was over Coyote was being escorted out of the building by police officers from the Tuscaloosa Police Department who heard the ruckus live on-air and rushed to the station while the manager of Z-102, Steve Russell and Coyote J began fighting over the live microphone. Coyote was reinstated for a short time afterwards but was let go from Z-102 for keeps in 1989.
 The edited audio of Coyote J getting fired uploaded to YouTube garnered over half a million views in less than a year.

In 1989 Coyote J was hired by I-95, Z's cross-town rival. I-95 OM Randy Lane decided to make him part of their new morning team to replace the popular duo, Mark and Brian, who had left for KLOS Los Angeles. The Morning Wake Up Service with Andy Spinosi, Trey Matthews, and Coyote J debut in the spring of 1989. I-95 decided not to resign the trio in 1992.

In 1992 The Edge went into syndication. From 1992 to 2002 The Edge aired on dozens of Alabama outlets: WVNA-Muscle Shoals, WQEN Gadsden, WTGZ Auburn, WHHY Montgomery, Z102.5 Tuscaloosa/Birmingham, I-95 and WRAX Birmingham, among others.

The X Years
In 1995, Coyote J was hired as one of the original air talents to help launch alt outlet The X (WRAX-FM) in Birmingham. Between 1998 and 2002 Coyote also wrote music reviews for The Birmingham Weekly. Coyote J stayed with The X until December 2006 when the station fell on hard times and flipped to Adult AAA

In January 2007, The Edge re-debut in Birmingham on ROCK 99.5 in its usual Sunday night time slot.

Coyote J's contract for The Edge with ROCK 99/WZRR expired January 2009, at which time Coyote J pulled The Edge plug for good and retired the show. Coyote J returned to ROCK 99 to do a classic rock show in February 2009. Coyote left Citadel Broadcasting February 14, 2010 ending a tenure at Cidadel that spanned 15 years.

In 2010, Coyote J began collaborating with the German dark wave band, Feeding Fingers and co-produced their third album, Detach Me From My Head. Battan is currently working with Feeding Fingers and songwriter Justin Curfman on the band's fourth album.
April 2012 saw the release of a new single by Feeding Fingers, 'Inside The Body Of An Animal' produced by Coyote J and Justin.

Feeding Fingers fourth album, 'The Occupant', was released in late February 2013. Because of Justin Curfman's relocation to Germany the album had a number of producers. On this release Coyote J co-produced only three tracks: 'Inside The Body Of An Animal', 'I Drink Disappearing Ink' and 'Paper Dolls Would Eat Glass For Us,' as well as providing financial support.

"Polaroid Papercuts," an advance single from the upcoming Feeding Fingers triple album "Attend," produced by Coyote J and Dana Culling, was released on March 16, 2015.

Revival of The EDGE on the Internet - 2013
On October 19, 2013, Coyote J debuted The Edge 24/7 online:

The Edge online ceased operation May 27, 2019, after 35 years, while marking Coyote's 50th year in broadcasting.

References

External links
 Hang the DJ, "Hang The DJ" with Coyote J." - Black & White
 COYOTE CALHOUN remembers the WSGN-WERC rivalry of the '70s, "COYOTE J. CALHOUN
and the WSGN-WERC radio war of the 1970s"
 Coyote J. Calhoun - Bhamwiki, Birmingham Wiki
 The Golden Age of Birmingham Broadcasting, Black & White - "The Golden Age of Birmingham"
 Memories of Nashville Rock Radio
 KET Louisville Life: Coyote Calhoun Story KET is a PBS station
 Coyote Calhoun Inducted into DJ Hall of Fame
 Coyote Calhoun to retire after 35 years at WAMZ
 Coyote Calhoun Page listing numerous other articles about him
 Kris Applegate, Legendary Locals of Louisville, p. 63, ISBN 1439645876, 2014, Arcadia Publishing Inc.
 Coyote Calhoun Ends 35-Year Career

Audio Bits from WZBQ
 Coyote J. WZBQ, Coyote J on WZBQ - 1
 Coyote J. WZBQ, Coyote J on WZBQ - 2
 COYOTE J THE EDGE, CLASSIC EDGE SHOWS

Audio from WERC (1970s)
 Coyote J. Calhoun WERC Air Check 1975 -- Coyote Does The News

Coyote J's Music Reviews Archive from the Birmingham Weekly
 Edgemusic.net

Living people
American radio DJs
1953 births